Dysschema lunifera is a moth of the family Erebidae. It was described by Arthur Gardiner Butler in 1871. It is found in Bahia, Brazil.

References

Dysschema
Moths described in 1871